Igitkin Island is a small island located in an area between Adak Island and Atka Island among other small islands. The island belongs to the Andreanof Islands of the Aleutian Islands of Alaska.

References

Andreanof Islands
Uninhabited islands of Alaska
Islands of Alaska
Islands of Unorganized Borough, Alaska